

Stanislav Range Front Light or Small Adzhyhol Lighthouse is an active lighthouse and range light, located on a concrete pier on a tiny islet about  west northwest of Rybalce, about  from Kherson, Ukraine. Together with Adziogol lighthouse, located  109° from it, it serves guiding ships entering the Dnieper River.

The lighthouse is a vertical lattice hyperboloid structure of steel bars, designed in 1910 by Vladimir Shukhov. A watch room is enclosed by the structure, and a one-storey lighthouse keeper's house adjoins the lighthouse.

The site of the tower is accessible only by boat. The site is open to the public but the tower is closed.

See also 

 List of lighthouses in Ukraine
 Thin-shell structure
 List of hyperboloid structures
 List of thin shell structures

References

External links 
 

Lighthouses completed in 1911
Lattice shell structures by Vladimir Shukhov
Hyperboloid structures
Lighthouses in Ukraine
Dnieper–Bug estuary
Buildings and structures in Kherson Oblast
1911 establishments in the Russian Empire